The Arnett Gardens Football Club is a Jamaican football club based in Kingston, which currently plays in the Jamaica National Premier League.

The team is based in the Arnett Gardens community of South Saint Andrew, Jamaica, and plays in the Anthony Spaulding Sports Complex.

History
The team came out of a merger between the All Saints and Jones Town Football teams in 1977. Arnett's fans originate primarily from Arnett Gardens and its adjoining communities – Jones Town, Craig Town, Hannah Town & Admiral Town. The Junglists, as their fans are known, are very passionate and vociferous about their team and will travel all over the country in support of the team. The Arnett Gardens part of Kingston is popularly known as the Concrete Jungle, hence the nickname of the club.

The club won the league in its very first season, 1978. Although it suffered a long drought after that, it re-emerged at the start of the new millennium, winning both the 2000–01 and 2001–02 championships.

Recent seasons and managerial changes
The start of the 2007–08 season proved to be one of their worst ever and forced coach Max Straw to resign on 14 January 2008 to be replaced by former coach Jerome Waite, who led Arnett Gardens to the celebrated back-to-back titles of 2001 and 2002. They then finished the season four points above the relegation zone after winning 3 of their final 4 games.

Waite himself was axed after only four games into the 2008–09 season, losing all games and managing to score only one goal. He was replaced by Fabian Davis, who left his post at the end of 2009. As of January 2010, Wayne Fairclough was the team's coach but he decided to quit in October 2010. Fairclough was succeeded by former national team striker Paul Davis.

Davis took them to a creditable 5th place in the 2012–13 season, his third with the club, before he resigned in November 2012 citing a lack of commitment from the players and other issues within the club. In October 2013, his successor Calvin Lewis resigned and his place was taken by former coach Jerome Waite.

Alex Thomas took over the reigns for the 2019/2020 season. On October 22, 2021 he had resigned from his position as head coach.

On October 26, 2021, Paul Davis was announced as the newly appointed head coach.

Players

Current squad

Other players under contract

Achievements
CFU Club Championship
Runners-up (2): 2002, 2018

Jamaica National Premier League
Champions (5): 1978, 2001, 2002, 2015, 2017

External links
 Official website
 Team profile at Golocaljamaica

References

Football clubs in Jamaica
Association football clubs established in 1977
Sport in Kingston, Jamaica
1977 establishments in Jamaica